Maria Luisa Altieri Biagi (9 April 1930 – 29 November 2017) was an Italian scholar and writer.

Life
Altieri Biagi graduated from the University of Florence, where she studied Linguistics, and was a professor of the History of the Italian language at the University of Trieste since 1967, and at the University of Bologna since 1974.

Her numerous studies have helped to promote a knowledge of the Italian language, stylistics and jargons.

She wrote essays on the language of important historical characters, as Galileo Galilei and Francesco Redi.

She was further a member of Crusca Academy and of Science Academy of Bologna. Biagi died on 29 November 2017 in Bologna, aged 87.

Works
 Galileo e la terminologia tecnico-scientifica, Florence, Olschki, 1965;
 Lingua e cultura di Francesco Redi, medico, Florence, Olschki, 1968:
 (with G. Devoto) La lingua italiana. Storia e problemi attuali, Torino, ERI, 1968; 
 La lingua in scena, Bologna, Zanichelli, 1980;
 (with Bruno Basile) Scienziati del Seicento, Milan-Naples, Ricciardi, 1980; 
 (with Bruno Basile) Scienziati del Settecento, Milan-Naples, Ricciardi, 1983; 
 Linguistica essenziale, Milan, Garzanti, 1985;
 La grammatica dal testo, Milan, Mursia, 1987; 
 L'italiano dai testi, Milan, Mursia, 1988;
 L'avventura della mente. Studi sulla lingua scientifica dal Due al Settecento, Naples, Morano, 1990.

References

1930 births
2017 deaths
Italian women essayists
Italian essayists
Women linguists
University of Florence alumni
Academic staff of the University of Bologna
Writers from Venice